The Interurban multiple units (IMU) are a class of electric multiple units manufactured by Walkers Limited/Downer EDI Rail, Maryborough for Queensland Rail's Citytrain division between 1996 and 2011. The IMU is divided into in three subclasses, units 101-110 as the 100 series, units 121-124 as the 120 series, and units 161-188, as the 160 series.

Design
The Interurban Multiple Units are a long-distance optimised version of the Suburban Multiple Units. Internally, the IMUs differ from the SMUs, being fitted with larger seats, luggage racks and mobility-access toilets.  Like most trains in the Citytrain fleet, two three-car IMUs can be coupled to form one six-car unit.

History

100 series
To provide rolling stock for the new Gold Coast line to Helensvale, in 1993 a contract for four 100 class units was awarded to Walkers Limited, Maryborough. The 100 were manufactured by Walkers Limited, Maryborough in partnership with ABB. The first four IMU100s, 101 to 104 entered service in 1996 before the opening of the new line. As these were never going to be adequate to operate all services on the line, in July 1995 a further six were ordered. They were delivered in 1997. They feature luggage racks, disabled access toilets, and high-backed cloth seating. IMU 105 still retains the green ocean themed seating moquette, which has been replaced in all other units. The only other train this design can be seen on is the ICE.

120 series 
In 1999, four 120 series units were ordered for the Airtrain line to Brisbane Airport.

They entered service in 2001, fitted with high-backed seats with a head cushion as an extension as the seat design is based on the SMU 220s, one toilet per unit and luggage racks in different configurations due to the interior design differences to its predecessor. The 100 series and 120 series are interoperable, and used to operate together in revenue service as six-car units, but no longer do so due to electrical and mechanical differences.

The 120 series were the final batch of trains manufactured by Walkers Limited before being absorbed by Downer Group, Maryborough in partnership with ADtranz, which was likewise taken over by Bombardier.

160 series

In 2004, Queensland Rail ordered sixteen 160 series units to provide extra rolling stock in conjunction with the upgrade and duplication of the Gold Coast line. The 160 series were manufactured by Downer EDI Rail, Maryborough in partnership with Bombardier Transportation. These trains are similar in design to the Transperth B-series train, V/Line VLocity DMU & Adelaide Metro 4000 Series with alterations to the headlights to complement with the rest of the Citytrain fleet. These trains are interoperable with the 260 series Suburban Multiple Units as they have almost identical specifications.

In early 2007, during safety checks, it was discovered that air-conditioning units on the trains were 10 millimetres too wide for the loading gauge.

On 28 May 2007, the first of the new IMUs entered service on the Gold Coast line.

Most IMU160 services on the Gold Coast have been superseded by the faster New Generation Rollingstock.

Gallery

Derailments
On 31 January 2013, IMU173 derailed at Cleveland station and ran into the station's toilet block, injuring 14. Only minor injuries were reported. The damaged car IM5173 was eventually repaired and returned to service.

Notes

References

External links

QR awards multi-million-dollar Citytrain contract
QRIG.org Motive Power Section
Interurban Multiple Unit (IMU100) Queensland Rail
Interurban Multiple Unit (IMU120) Queensland Rail
Interurban Multiple Unit (IMU160) Queensland Rail
Specifications (100 series)
Specifications (120 series)

Electric multiple units of Queensland
Queensland Rail City network
Train-related introductions in 1996
25 kV AC multiple units
Bombardier Transportation multiple units
Walkers Limited multiple units